Tremella reticula, the white coral jelly fungus, is a species of fungus of the Tremellaceae family. Its tube-shaped basidiocarps usually feature a yellowish off-white colour and have a gelatinous and elastic texture. Found in humid environments amongst rotting logs of deciduous trees, particularly from maples and oaks, it is often observed growing throughout the months of August to September.

Description 
The white coral jelly fungus usually has multiple tube-shaped basidiocarps forming around a central point. Such structures are roughly 3 to 20 cm in diameter and 3 to 12 cm tall. The associated spore print is white.

Edibility 
Sources disagree in terms of this fungus' edibility. However it is never considered dangerous, nor is it of exceptional culinary use.

References 

Tremellomycetes